Brian Johnson is an Australian curler. He is originally from Winnipeg, Manitoba.

At the international level, he is a two-time  curler (1992, 1993).

Teams and events

References

External links

Living people
Australian male curlers
Pacific-Asian curling champions

Date of birth missing (living people)
Place of birth missing (living people)
Canadian emigrants to Australia
Curlers from Winnipeg
Year of birth missing (living people)